Charles, Charlie, Charley, or Chuck Wilson may refer to:

Entertainment
 Charles Heath Wilson (1809–1882), Anglo-Scottish painter, art teacher and author
 Charles C. Wilson (1894–1948), American film actor
 Charles Banks Wilson (1918–2013), American artist
 Charles Wilson (composer) (1931–2019), Canadian composer and choral conductor
 Chuck Wilson (jazz musician) (born 1948), American jazz musician
 Charlie Wilson (singer) (born 1953), American R&B singer known as the frontman of the Gap Band 
 Ricky Wilson (singer) (Charles Richard Wilson, born 1978), lead singer of Kaiser Chiefs and judge on The Voice

Government and politics

Australia
 Charles Wilson (Australian politician) (1842–1926), member of the New South Wales Parliament

Canada
 Charles Wilson (Quebec politician) (1808–1877), member of the Legislative Council of Quebec, Canadian senator
 Charles Wilson (British Columbia politician) (1841–1924), first leader of the B.C. Conservative Party

New Zealand
 Charles Wilson (librarian) (1857–1932), Member of Parliament and parliamentary librarian
 Charles Wilson (New Zealand Reform Party politician) (1862–1934), Member of Parliament

United Kingdom
 Charles Rivers Wilson (1831–1916), British civil servant and financier
 Charles Wilson, 1st Baron Nunburnholme (1833–1907), English shipowner, Liberal Member of Parliament (MP)
 Charles Wilson (Conservative politician) (1859–1930), MP for Leeds Central
 Charles Wilson, 2nd Baron Nunburnholme (1875–1924), Liberal MP for Hull West, son of the 1st Baron

United States
 Charles Burnett Wilson (1850–1926), Marshal of the Kingdom of Hawaii
 Charles Edward Wilson (businessman) (1886–1972), CEO of GE and member of the Truman Administration
 Charles Erwin Wilson (1890–1961), United States Secretary of Defense (1953–1957) and head of General Motors
 Malcolm Wilson (governor) (Charles Malcolm Wilson, 1914–2000), Governor of New York
 Charles H. Wilson (1917–1984), U.S. Congressman from California and State Assemblyman
 Charlie Wilson (Texas politician) (1933–2010), U.S. Congressman from Texas, 1973–1997; previously State Representative, then State Senator
 Charlie Wilson (Ohio politician) (1943–2013), U.S. Congressman, previously State Representative, then State Senator
 Charles G. Wilson, former New York businessman and New York Director of Health

Military
 Charles Wilson (sailor) (1836–?), Union Navy sailor during the American Civil War
 Charles Edward Wilson (rugby union) (1871–1914), British military officer and rugby union player
 Charles E. Wilson (Medal of Honor), American Civil War sergeant
 Chuck Wilson (pilot) (born 1953), American USAF military officer

Science
 Charles Branch Wilson (1861–1941), American marine biologist
 Charles Byron Wilson (1929–2018), American neurosurgeon
 Charles Thomson Rees Wilson (1869–1959), Scottish physicist awarded the Nobel Prize
 Charles William Wilson (1836–1905), English geographer, archaeologist and major general
 Charles Wilson, 1st Baron Moran (1882–1977), British, Winston Churchill's private physician

Sports

 Charles Plumpton Wilson (1859–1938), England footballer
 Charles Wilson (fencer) (1865–1950), British Olympic fencer
 Charles Wilson (cricketer) (1869–1952), Australian cricketer who played mainly in New Zealand
 Chilla Wilson (Charles Roy Wilson, 1931–2016), Australian rugby union player and manager
 Charles Wilson (American football) (born 1968), former National Football League wide receiver
 Charley Wilson (1895–1965), American Negro leagues baseball player
 Charlie Wilson (footballer, born 1877) (1877–?), played for Liverpool and Stockport County
 Charlie Wilson (footballer, born 1895) (1895–1971), played for Spurs, Huddersfield Town and Stoke City
 Charlie Wilson (footballer, born 1904) (1904–1994), played for Grimsby Town
 Charlie Wilson (Burnley footballer), played for Burnley
 Charlie Wilson (baseball) (1905–1970), Major League Baseball player
 Charlie Wilson (footballer, born 1905) (1905–1985), played for West Bromwich Albion, Sheffield Wednesday
 Chuck Wilson (athlete) (born 1968), American sprinter
 Chuck Wilson (baseball) (1929–1983), American Negro leagues baseball player

Others
 Charles Wilson (Scottish architect) (1810–1861), Scottish architect
 Charles Alfred Wilson (1855-1935), American civil engineer
 Charles Edward Wilson (educationalist) (1815–1888), first Chief Inspector of Schools in Scotland
 Charles Robert Wilson (1863–1904), English academic and historian of British India
 Charles C. Wilson (architect) (1864–1933), American architect
 Charles J. A. Wilson (1880-1965), Scottish-born American artist, painter, etcher, and illustrator
 Charles Wilson (political scientist) (1909–2002), Scottish political scientist and university administrator
 Charles Kemmons Wilson (1913–2003), founder of the Holiday Inn chain of hotels
 Charles Wilson (historian) (1914–1991), English business historian and Cambridge University professor
 Charlie Wilson (criminal) (1932–1990), English career criminal, one of the Great Train Robbery gang
 Charles Wilson (journalist) (1935–2022), Scottish-born newspaper editor
 Charles R. Wilson (judge) (born 1954), U.S. Court of Appeals judge
 Charles Anthony Corbett Wilson, Australian civil engineer
 Charles Corbett Powell Wilson, his son, Australian engineer and public servant
 Charles Morrow Wilson, American writer
 Charles Wilson (economist), American economist
 Chuck Wilson (sports journalist) (born 1954), regular host of GameNight on ESPN Radio
 Chuck Wilson (multimedia executive) (born 1968)

See also 
 Charles-Avila Wilson (1869–1936), Canadian lawyer, politician, and judge
 Charles Wilsonn (1752–1829), Member of Parliament for Bewdley, 1814–1818
 Charles E. Wilson (1973 ship), a ship launched in 1973 named for Charles E. Wilson